The 2013 Dayton Sharks season was the first season for the Continental Indoor Football League (CIFL) franchise.

In July 2012, the team announced CA Sports Entertainment LLC. was awarded an expansion franchise in Dayton, Ohio and that the team would be named the Dayton Sharks. The Sharks filled the void left after the Dayton Silverbacks folded at the conclusion of the 2012 season. The team is led by Corwyn Thomas, who is the team's Managing General Partner, CEO and Chairman. The team signed many local players, who have a track record for success, such at Tommy Jones and Robert Redd. The franchise played its first game on February 15, defeating the Port Huron Patriots, 16-64. Over 2,500 turned out to the Sharks' opening game.

Players

Signings

Roster

Schedule

Regular season

Standings

Postseason

Coaching staff

References

2013 Continental Indoor Football League season
Dayton Sharks
Dayton Sharks